Natasha Brennan (born 11 October 1986) is a female rugby union and represented  at the 2014 Women's Rugby World Cup. She replaced Lydia Thompson who suffered a groin injury in the warm-up ahead of England's second game against .

Brennan has also played for the English women's sevens team. She scored 16 tries in only 12 games in the 2013–14 Women's Sevens World Series.

References

External links
 RFU Player Profile

1986 births
Living people
England women's international rugby union players
English female rugby union players
Female rugby sevens players
Alumni of the University of Kent
21st-century English women